Ensulizole (INN; also known as phenylbenzimidazole sulfonic acid) is a common sunscreen agent.  In 1999, the United States Food and Drug Administration regulated that the name ensulizole be used on sunscreen labels in the United States. Ensulizole is primarily a UVB protecting agent providing only minimal UVA protection. The scope of UVB is 290 to 340 nanometers whereas the UVA range is 320 to 400 nanometers. For better UVA protection, it must be paired with avobenzone, titanium dioxide, or zinc oxide; outside of the United States it can also be paired with a UV absorber of the Tinosorb or Mexoryl types. Because ensulizole is water-soluble, it has the characteristic of feeling lighter on skin. As such, it is often used in sunscreen lotions or moisturizers whose aesthetic goal is a non-greasy finish. The free acid is poorly soluble in water, so it is only used as its soluble salts.

References

External links
Thomson MICROMEDEX - Sunscreen Agents (Topical)
Phenylbenzimidazole sulfonic acid

Benzimidazoles
Sulfonic acids
Sunscreening agents